Dave Attell: Road Work is a 2014 stand-up comedy special starring Dave Attell.

Overview
Comedy Central stand-up special that cuts together multiple performances from Dave Attell's past tour.

Critical recaption
Paste wrote "As expected, Attell doesn’t hold back on disgusting and self-deprecating humor. He confesses that his genitals look more and more like a tent that no one knows how to fold and that on his best day his junk smells like a foot. His transitions make no sense at all, going from sex toys to his wishful plans of having a family, and the absurdity only makes it funnier."

References

External links

Stand-up comedy
Humour